Metzneria lacrimosa is a moth of the family Gelechiidae. It was described by Edward Meyrick in 1913. It is found in Tunisia.

References

Moths described in 1913
Metzneria